This is a list of Third Lanark A.C. seasons in Scottish football, from their foundation in 1872 to their dissolution in 1967. It details the club's achievements in senior league and cup competitions and the top scorers for each season. The list of top scorers also chronicles how the club's scoring records have progressed throughout the club's history.

Third Lanark were formed in 1872, playing at the original Cathkin Park in Glasgow's Crosshill neighbourhood. The club soon became members of the Scottish Football Association and initially began competing in the Scottish Cup from its first season. They played in the inaugural season of the Scottish Football League, in 1890–91. In their early years, Thirds existed in the shadow of their neighbours Queen's Park, and even took over the Spiders home ground Hampden Park in 1903 – renaming it New Cathkin Park – when Queen's Park moved out to a larger replacement further south which (was also named Hampden Park and is the earliest version of the extant stadium bearing that name). By the time of the stadium move, Third Lanark had already won the Scottish Cup (1889) and celebrated their new surroundings by winning the League Championship for what would prove to be the only time. Another cup win followed in 1905, but from then on, major honours would elude them as the other Glasgow clubs Rangers and Celtic became increasingly more successful and popular, although they reached further finals and maintained their presence in the top division for the majority of the next 60 years.

Third Lanark reached the 1959 Scottish League Cup Final, losing to Heart of Midlothian, and finished in third place in the 1960–61 Scottish League. However, despite winning the Glasgow Cup and building a new stand at their ground in 1963 they suffered relegation two years later, and a drop in spectator numbers and financial mismanagement and possible embezzlement led to them being liquidated just two years later in 1967. Their rapid demise was in stark contrast to the fortunes of their old Glasgow rivals that year, as Celtic finished that season as European champions, Rangers also reached the final of the Cup Winners' Cup and Clyde finished in third place behind the Old Firm. The Cathkin park ground still exists as a municipal park surrounded by crumbling remains of the terracing.

Seasons

Key

League performance summary 
The Scottish Football League was founded in 1890 and, other than during seven years of hiatus during World War II, the national top division has been played every season since. The following is a summary of Third Lanark's divisional status until their dissolution in 1967:

70 total eligible seasons
58 seasons in top level
12 seasons in second level

References

Sources
Soccerbase
FitbaStats
Football Club History Database

Seasons
Third Lanark A.C.
Seasons
Third Lanark A.C. seasons